Martin Bratanov is a Bulgarian-born male former international table tennis player from Belgium.

He won a silver medal at the 2001 World Table Tennis Championships in the Swaythling Cup (men's team event) with Marc Closset, Andras Podpinka, Jean-Michel Saive and Philippe Saive for Belgium.

See also
 List of table tennis players
 List of World Table Tennis Championships medalists

References

Belgian male table tennis players
Bulgarian male table tennis players
1974 births
Living people
World Table Tennis Championships medalists